Lütte Bermecke  is a small river of North Rhine-Westphalia, Germany. It is left tributary of the Bache (the upper course of the Heve).

See also
List of rivers of North Rhine-Westphalia

Rivers of North Rhine-Westphalia
Rivers of Germany